Praveen Oberoi (born 7 September 1953) is an Indian former cricketer. He played 29 first-class matches for Delhi between 1972 and 1981.

See also
 List of Delhi cricketers

References

External links
 

1953 births
Living people
Indian cricketers
Delhi cricketers
Punjabi people
Cricketers from Delhi